Howard M. Mitchell (December 11, 1883 – October 9, 1958) was an American actor and film director. He appeared in 270 films between 1910 and 1952 and directed 38 silent films between 1915 and 1927.

Selected filmography

 The Shadow of Tragedy (1914, Short)
 The Beloved Adventurer (1914)
 The Road o' Strife (1915)
The Great Ruby (1915)
 The Law That Divides (1918)
 Faith (1920)
 Molly and I (1920)
 The Little Wanderer (1920)
 Flame of Youth (1920)
 Love's Harvest (1920)
 Wing Toy (1921)
 Cinderella of the Hills (1921)
 Queenie (1921)
 The Mother Heart (1921)
 Lovetime (1921)
 Ever Since Eve (1921)
 The Lamplighter (1921)
 The Great Night (1922)
 Man's Size (1923)
 Forgive and Forget (1923)
 Romance Ranch (1924)
 The Lone Chance (1924 - directed)
 The Jazz Girl (1926)
 Hidden Aces (1927)
 Thrill of a Lifetime (1937)
 Wild Money (1937)
 Tom Sawyer, Detective (1938)
 Irish Luck (1939)
 Killer at Large (1947)

References

External links

1883 births
1958 deaths
American male film actors
20th-century American male actors
American film directors
Male actors from Pittsburgh